We Must Believe in Magic is the fourth studio album by American country music singer Crystal Gayle. Released on June 24, 1977, it became her highest selling album, reaching #2 on the Billboard Country Albums chart and #12 on the main Billboard album chart (her first album to enter the main chart and her only album to make the Top 30 there to date). It was certified platinum by the RIAA in 1978. The album also has the distinction of being the first platinum album recorded by a female artist in country music. It was also Gayle's first album to chart in the UK, where it reached #15, and was certified silver by the BPI. In the Netherlands, it stayed on the charts for two weeks and peaked at #29.

The album contains Gayle's huge international chart hit "Don't It Make My Brown Eyes Blue", which was not only her third #1 Country chart hit, but also reached #2 on the Billboard 100, becoming her biggest hit. Another track, "River Road", charted at #64 on the Country Singles chart when it appeared on the Favorites compilation album in 1980.

Track listing

Charts

Production
Produced by Allen Reynolds
Engineered by Garth Fundis

Personnel
Gene Chrisman, Jimmy Isbell, Kenny Malone – drums, percussion
Joe Allen, Mike Leech – bass guitar
David Kirby, Johnny Christopher, Jimmy Colvard, Reggie Young, Allen Reynolds – guitars
Lloyd Green – steel guitar
Bobby Wood, Hargus "Pig" Robbins – keyboards
Charles Cochran - keyboards, string and horn arrangements
Shane Keister – synthesizers
New Grass Revival, The Trolleycar Band – special effects
Buddy Spicher, Sam Bush – fiddle
Courtney Johnson – banjo
Billy Puett – flute, clarinet
Carl Gorodetsky, Gary Vanosdale, George Binkley, Lennie Haight, Marvin Chantry, Roy Christensen, Sheldon Kurland – strings
Janie Fricke, Marcia Routh, Pebble Daniel, Sandy Mason Theoret, Garth Fundis – backing vocals

References

External links
 "We Must Believe in Magic" at discogs

Crystal Gayle albums
1977 albums
Albums produced by Allen Reynolds
United Artists Records albums